Ikinimba is probably the most revered musical tradition in Rwanda. It is a dance that tells the stories of Rwandan heroes and kings, accompanied by instruments like ingoma, ikembe, iningiri, umuduri and inanga.

World music genres